Boheme is the second album of the French duo Deep Forest, released in 35 countries. It mainly sampled Eastern European gypsy songs (i.e. the Bohemians, hence the name of the album) with electronic music. Hit singles included "Marta's Song" (featuring Márta Sebestyén) and "Freedom Cry". The album became the duo's most successful one, selling over 4 million copies, receiving Diamond, Platinum and Gold awards in 15 countries and winning the Grammy Award for Best World Music Album .

The song "Freedom Cry" caused controversy when it was revealed that the singer, Károly Rostás ("Huttyán"), never received any monetary compensation from the song, and neither did his family after he died in 1986. His singing, archived by Claude Flagel, was sampled by Deep Forest. Flagel allegedly paid Huttyán 1500 forints for the recording. The case was later documented in a movie entitled Huttyán, released in 1996.
The Gypsy relatives did succeed to some extent to get money from Deep Forest.

Track listing 
 "Anasthasia" – 1:48
 "Bohemian Ballet" – 5:15
 "Marta's Song" (feat. Márta Sebestyén) – 4:13
 "Gathering" – 4:39
 "Lament" – 3:09
 "Bulgarian Melody" (feat. Márta Sebestyén) – 3:09
 "Deep Folk Song" – 1:13
 "Freedom Cry" (feat. Károly Rostás) – 3:17
 "Twosome" (feat. Márta Sebestyén) – 4:06
 "Cafe Europa" – 4:17
 "Katharina" – 2:53
 "Boheme" – 4:37
 "While the Earth Sleeps" (European Edition Bonus Track, feat. Peter Gabriel) – 6:23

Reception

Charts

Weekly charts

Certifications and sales

References

External links 
 Details and lyrical translations from Boheme

1995 albums
Deep Forest albums
Grammy Award for Best World Music Album